Electrostrymon pan is a butterfly of the family Lycaenidae. It was described by Dru Drury in 1773 from Jamaica.

Description
Upperside: antennae black. Thorax, abdomen, and wings dark brown, or dark hair-coloured; the latter being furnished with two small tails like hairs, the extremities being white.

Underside: palpi white. Breast greyish. Wings nearly the same colour as on the upperside. The posterior having two eyes on each at the abdominal corners; one being black with a red iris, the other grey and faint; above them is a small indented white line, pointing to a spot of the same colour placed at the middle of the anterior edge. Wingspan  inches (32 mm).

References

Butterflies described in 1773
Eumaeini
Lycaenidae of South America
Taxa named by Dru Drury